The "Catalan of the Year" award is organized by El Periódico de Catalunya, which since 2000 recognizes the Catalan person who was the most prominent in the development of their social or professional activity during the previous year. The award is voted by readers of the newspaper, after a previous selection of different nominees by a jury composed of persons from different social environments.

The award ceremony "Catalan of the Year" takes place during a solemn ceremony at the Palau de la Música Catalana in Barcelona, at the end of each January, attended by the President of the Generalitat of Catalonia, the Mayor of Barcelona, and other personalities of the political, economic, social and cultural life of Catalonia.

Along with the prize "Catalan of the Year", the Journal of Catalonia also delivers other awards. The winner of the award in 2011 was Joaquim Maria Puyal.

Winners
{|  style="background:#ffffff" class="sortable wikitable"
|+ 
|-
! style="background:#efefef;"| Year !! style="background:#efefef;" width=250 px| Awards !! style="background:#efefef;"| Field
|-
|-
| 2000 || Ernest Lluch, (given posthumously) || Politician
|-
| 2001 || Pau Gasol || Basketball Player
|-
| 2002 || Manuela de Madre || Politician
|-
| 2003 || Ferran Adrià || Chef
|-
| 2004 || Joan Manuel Serrat || Singer
|-
| 2005 || Joan Massagué || Oncology Scientist
|-
| 2006 || Neus Català || A survivor of the Ravensbrück concentration camp
|-
| 2007 || Pasqual Maragall || Politician, President of the Generalitat de Catalunya
|-
| 2008 || Vicente Ferrer Moncho || Philanthropist
|-
| 2009 || Pep Guardiola || Coach of FC Barcelona
|-
| 2010 || David Miret || Leader of the Castellers de Vilafranca
|-
| 2011 || Joaquim Maria Puyal || Journalist
|-
| 2012 || Josep Sánchez de Toledo || Head of Children's Oncology at Vall d'Hebron University Hospital
|-
|2013 || Josefina Castellví i Piulachs || Oceanographer, first woman to lead a scientific base in the Antarctica
|-
|2014 || Lucía Caram || Dominica nun, Social activist.
|-
|2015 || Óscar Camps || Activist from Proactiva open arms
|-
|2016 || Oriol Mitjà || Physician-scientist who developed an effective treatment to eradicate yaws 
|-
|2017 || Josep Maria Pou || actor
|}

References

External links
 Especial Catalán del Año 2005 (in Spanish)

Catalan awards